The Rev. William Jay (6 May 176927 December 1853) was an English nonconformist divine who preached for sixty years at Argyle Chapel in Bath. He was an eminent English Congregationalist minister of Regency England.

Early life
William Jay was born at Tisbury in Wiltshire. He adopted his father's trade of stonemason and worked with him on alterations to Fonthill House, but gave it up in 1785 in order to enter the Rev. Cornelius Winter's school at Marlborough. Before he was twenty-one he had preached nearly a thousand times, and in 1788 he had for a while occupied Rowland Hill's pulpit at the Surrey Chapel in London. Wishing to have time for self-education or scholarly interests, he accepted the pastorate of Christian Malford near Chippenham where he remained about two years. This was followed by one year at Hope Chapel, Clifton.

Life as a preacher and writer
On 30 January 1791 Jay was called to the ministry of the Independent or Congregationalist chapel with which he became connected, Argyle Chapel in Bath. Here he followed revivalist principles by preaching to people regardless of religious denomination or social rank; attracting note as a populist pulpit orator, religious author and scholar, and a counselor. Richard Brinsley Sheridan praised his oratorical skills.

William Jay's connection with Argyle Chapel came to an end in January 1853. He died on 27 December following in Bath. Amongst the best-known of his works are his Morning and Evening Exercises; The Christian Contemplated; The Domestic Ministers Assistant; and his Discourses. He also wrote a Life of Rev. Cornelius Winter, Memoirs of Rev. John Clarke and Female Scripture Characters, along with Jay's Works (first published in the early 1840s, and again in 1856, followed by a new edition in 1876).

Family

One of William Jay's sons, also William Jay (1792/3-1837), became an architect, continuing the family's interest in stonemasonry and building design.
William Jay's eldest daughter, Anne, married Robert Bolton and, among their thirteen children was William Jay Bolton, who became an early artisan of stained glass in America.

Notes

References
 Jay, William (1854; reprinted 1974) The Autobiography of William Jay (repro. ed. : Edinburgh, Banner of Truth, 1974)
Wilson, S. (1854) The Rev. William Jay: a memoir by the Rev. S. S. Wilson. London: Binns & Goodwin 1854
Silvester, James (1900) Two Famous Preachers of Bath: brief biographies of William Jay and William Connor Magee. London: C. J. Thynne
Sherman, James (1854) Ministerial Qualifications and Success:a  sermon preached at Argyle Chapel, Bath, on Sunday evening, January 6, 1854, on the decease of the Rev. William Jay. London: Ward & Co

Attribution:

External links
 Architecture by Jay's son in America
 Life of William Jay, a dissertation
 Works of William Jay in PDF format (lacking one volume of the 12 plus six volumes of sermons taken in shorthand and a Jubilee memorial)

1769 births
1853 deaths
People from Tisbury, Wiltshire
English Christian religious leaders
English Congregationalist ministers
18th-century Christian clergy
19th-century Christian clergy